Metano is a 1951 Italian film.

Cast

External links
 

1951 films
Italian short films
1950s Italian-language films
1950s Italian films